The Selvatura Adventure Park, or Monteverde Nature Center, Hummingbird and Butterfly Gardens is a nature center in  Monteverde, northwestern Puntarenas Province, Costa Rica. It is located in the Cordillera de Tilarán mountain range, close to the village of Santa Elena.

See also 
 Monteverde Cloud Forest Reserve — adjacent.
 List of zoos by country: Costa Rica zoos

References

Museums in Costa Rica
Nature centers
Buildings and structures in Puntarenas Province
Tourist attractions in Puntarenas Province